Waid Academy Former Pupils Rugby Football Club is a rugby union club based in Anstruther, Fife.

Waid are sponsored by Allson Wholesale

History

The Waid Academy Former Pupil's Rugby Club beginnings can be traced back to 1887 when pupils and staff of Waid Academy created what was known as ‘The Etceteras‘ and played their first game in a friendly against Elie. The club has operated endlessly excluding disruptions during the first and second world wars.

Up until the early 60's, the president of the club was also the School's Head Master.

Waid Academy FPRFC still  play their home matches at the Waid Academy pitches on the grounds of the high school.

On 2 September 1983, The rugby club's members were able to purchase an old bakery on the Anstruther's High Street and this was transformed into the Waid Academy FPRFC Clubhouse.

Squad 2021/2022

Youth Development & Coaching 

The Waid Academy FPRFC Modern Apprentice for 2016/17 is David Hodge .

Waid Academy FPRFC run rugby programmes for all Primary School ages. This age group are known as the Waid Pirates and meet on a Sunday during term time at the Waid Academy pitches.

The club also coach those of High School age. There is an S1/2 team, an Under 16's team & an Under 18's team.

In late 2011, UKCC level 2 qualified Club Coach Co-Ordinator Zander Anderson was awarded The Royal Bank of Scotland Club Volunteer of the Month of November in association with Scottish Rugby Union.

Subsequently, in 2014, Richard Dyce was awarded the BT Club Volunteer of the Month for October in association with Scottish Rugby Union.

Senior Rugby 

Waid FPRFC run an over 35's team called The Waid Buccaneers.

The Waid Buccaneers won The St Andrews Day Veterans Tournament on Saturday 26 November 2011 held by Madras College FP RFC.

Waid Academy F.P. Sevens

The club run the Waid Academy F.P. Sevens. The Sevens tournament began in 1954; entrants play for the Wilson Cup.

Honours

 Waid Academy F.P. Sevens
 Champions: 1965, 1981, 1982, 1984, 1989
 Alloa Sevens
 Champions: 1982
 North of Scotland Cup
 Champions: 1933

Notable former players

Only one Waid Academy FPRFC player has represented Scotland.

Waid FP John Alexander Davidson gained his first cap for Scotland in 1959 against England National Rugby Union Team. He made three appearances for Scotland and whilst serving on overseas duty with the Royal Air Force (1952–54), captained the RAF Hong Kong XV, and the combined services XV. John also played for the Hong Kong Colony against the Fijians. Having learned his rugby at Waid Academy, John moved on to Edinburgh Wanderers and played for the North & Midlands side in 1958 against an Australian touring team. He also played for Racing Club de France in Paris, the club which is today better known as Racing 92. John was awarded the Honour of Life member of Waid FP Rugby Club in 1997. On the 22 January 2016, John died aged 83.

References 

Scottish rugby union teams
Rugby union in Fife